La Mothe-Saint-Héray is a commune in the Deux-Sèvres department in western France.

See also
Communes of the Deux-Sèvres department

References

External links

site on la mothe saint héray

Communes of Deux-Sèvres